Simon Credo Gbegnon Amoussou (born 27 October 1992) is a professional footballer who plays as a centre-back for  club Cholet. Born in France, he represents Togo at international level.

Club career
Born in Nantes to Togolese parents, Gbegnon started his career with Vaillante Sports d'Angers in the 2010–11 season. He subsequently represented FC Rezé and AC Chapelain, before joining USJA Carquefou in 2013, being initially assigned to the second team.

On 17 June 2015, Gbegnon joined SAS Épinal in the Championnat National, being a regular starter during his two-year spell. On 1 June 2017, he moved to fellow league team AS Béziers, and achieved promotion in his first campaign.

Gbegnon made his professional debut on 27 July 2018, coming on as a second-half substitute for Mickaël Diakota, in a 2–0 away win against AS Nancy. He scored his first goal the following 19 April, netting his team's third in a 6–5 away defeat of Valenciennes FC; he was a first-choice for the club during the campaign, but suffered team relegation.

On 7 August 2019, Gbegnon moved abroad for the first time in his career and signed for Segunda División newcomers CD Mirandés.

On 12 September 2022, Gbegnon signed a one-year contract with Cholet in Championnat National.

International career
Born in France, Gbegnon is of Togolese descent. He debuted for the Togo national football team in a friendly 0–0 tie with Libya on 24 March 2017.

References

External links
 
 
 
 
 

1992 births
Footballers from Nantes
French sportspeople of Togolese descent
Citizens of Togo through descent
Black French sportspeople
Living people
French footballers
Togolese footballers
Togo international footballers
Association football defenders
USJA Carquefou players
SAS Épinal players
AS Béziers (2007) players
CD Mirandés footballers
FC Dinamo Tbilisi players
SO Cholet players
Championnat National players
Ligue 2 players
Segunda División players
Erovnuli Liga players
French expatriate footballers
Togolese expatriate footballers
French expatriate sportspeople in Spain
Togolese expatriate sportspeople in Spain
Expatriate footballers in Spain
French expatriate sportspeople in Georgia (country)
Togolese expatriate sportspeople in Georgia (country)
Expatriate footballers in Georgia (country)